"Revolution Rock" is a song written and originally recorded by Danny Ray and covered by  the Clash, featuring on their 1979 album London Calling. Ray's version of the song was released as a single to modest success. According to Paul Simonon, "Danny Ray put out his version of "Revolution Rock" just before we were recording London Calling." Ray sampled the Jackie Edwards song "Get Up" on the track, so Edwards is listed as the co-writer. In the Clash's version Joe Strummer changed several of the lyrics, including a reference to Mack the Knife and the trend of smashing up seats at punk shows ("Everybody smash up your seats, and rock to this brand new beat").

The song is an ode to self-motivation. It was originally going to close London Calling, but "Train in Vain" was added at the last minute. There was another reggae song of the same title released in 1973 by Big Youth and Prince Buster. According to Ray, "The lyrics come from going to the clubs and seeing what was going on, you know?"

The song features staccato horn chants and "sinuous" guitar stylings. According to Sean Egan, "Strummer uses his voice almost as an instrument in the way he cleverly manufactures the illusion of call and response with already recorded instruments." An instrumental version of the song was featured on the Rude Boy film. "Revolution Rock" was a staple in live shows from the end of 1979 to 1981. According to Billboard, "With the help of sidemen the Irish Horns, the Clash get downright giddy."

References

Bibliography

Songs about revolutions
Songs about rock music
Year of song missing
Reggae songs
The Clash songs
Song recordings produced by Guy Stevens